The Famine Memorial Fountain is a memorial to the Great Famine in Mullingar, Ireland. The memorial stands in a public square at an intersection between Dominick Street and  Oliver Plunkett street.

History 
The memorial was dedicated in 1997, and features three sets of hand that each catch the water as it flows into a large millstone, in celebration of the towns former industrial past.

A plaque on the memorial reads:

'This sculpture commemorates the famine and its effects in the zone. The mill wheel ties the sculpture to Mullingar by the legend of St Colman. The hands are the hands of thousands.'

References 

1997 sculptures
Great Famine (Ireland) monuments and memorials
Monuments and memorials in the Republic of Ireland

Buildings and structures in Mullingar